Kali Hawk (born October 4, 1986) is an American actress, comedian, model and jewelry designer. She has starred in films such as Fifty Shades of Black, Couples Retreat, Bridesmaids and Tyler Perry Presents Peeples. She recurred as Shelby in New Girl and co-starred in the first two seasons of the Adult Swim series Black Jesus.

Life and career
Hawk was raised in Manhattan. Her father was in merchandising and her mother was a buyer for Bloomingdale's. She is of African-American, Native American, and German Jewish ancestry. She attended State University of New York at Purchase.

She has appeared in several commercials and music videos, and she competed in the fifth season of Last Comic Standing in 2007.

Hawk has appeared in numerous comedy films, including Couples Retreat, Get Him to the Greek, Bridesmaids, Peeples, Answer This! and Fifty Shades of Black.

In 2012, Hawk was added to the cast of the In Living Color reboot pilot, which did not go forward. She also recurred in the sitcom New Girl as Shelby.

In 2019, Hawk was added to the cast of the ABC television series Schooled playing Wilma, a science teacher who was poached from an elite school to teach at William Penn Academy.

Filmography

Film

Television

References

External links

1986 births
Living people
Actresses from New York City
People from Manhattan
African-American actresses
African-American Jews
American people of German-Jewish descent
Place of birth missing (living people)
American film actresses
American television actresses
American women comedians
American jewelry designers
Jewish American actresses
State University of New York at Purchase alumni
Comedians from New York City
21st-century American comedians
21st-century American actresses
21st-century African-American women
21st-century African-American people
21st-century American Jews
20th-century African-American people
20th-century African-American women
Women jewellers